The James C. and Mary A. Costello House is a historic building located in the Irvington neighborhood Portland, Oregon, United States. Built in 1910, it is an excellent example of the work of prominent architect Joseph Jacobberger at the height of the Arts and Crafts style in Portland residential architecture. During his prolific career Jacobberger contributed greatly to the spread of that style in Portland. James C. Costello was a developer who helped shape Irvington, and chose to locate his own home there.

The house was entered on the National Register of Historic Places in 2001.

See also
National Register of Historic Places listings in Northeast Portland, Oregon

References

External links

Oregon Historic Sites Database entry

Joseph Jacobberger buildings
Arts and Crafts architecture in Oregon
Houses completed in 1910
1910 establishments in Oregon
Houses on the National Register of Historic Places in Portland, Oregon
Irvington, Portland, Oregon
Portland Historic Landmarks